Jean-Baptiste Puech is a French actor. He graduated from the Maison des Conservatoires in 1998 and the Royal Scottish Academy of Music and Drama in 2000.

Filmography
 2014 Les Gazelles
 2009 Panique
 2009 Quand vient la peur
 2009 Le Repenti
 2008 Entre deux eaux
 2008 Do elephants pray?
 2007 Two days in Paris
 2006 La grande peur dans la montagne
 2005 Les chevaliers du ciel ( Sky fighters )
 2005 Les amants de la Dent Blanche
 2004 Le silence de la mer
 2003 Les passeurs
 2003 Double zero
 2002 Ce jour-la

Court metrage films
 2007 La Metier qui rentre
 2005 L'auto
 2004 J'ai peur, j'ai mal, je meurs
 2003 Chacun son camp
 2002 2+1

References

Year of birth missing (living people)
Living people
French male film actors
French male television actors